Lake Los Angeles is a census-designated place (CDP) in Los Angeles County, California, United States. The population was 12,328 at the 2010 census, up from 11,523 at the 2000 census. According to the Greater Antelope Valley Economic Alliance report of 2009, the Palmdale / Lancaster urban area has a population of 483,998, of which Lake Los Angeles is a part.

Transportation
Public transportation is operated by the Antelope Valley Transportation Authority with line 50 to Lancaster and line 51 to Palmdale.

History

The region was once called Los Angeles Buttes, since they were the only ones in the northern part of the county. The eponymous lakes (one dedicated to fishing and one dedicated to swimming and boating) have dried up. The fishing lake was stocked with trout, bass and catfish. In 1967, during the 1960s land speculation boom in the Antelope Valley, land developers bought  in the region, subdivided it into 4,465 lots, and artificially refilled the natural lake and named it Lake Los Angeles as an enticement to land buyers. Advertisements showed a water skier on the lake (which was probably no more than 5 feet deep) and a showcase home on the top of the nearby hill, giving the impression of a resort town. There was a country club and a high-end restaurant that over looked the large recreational lake. There was also a small store/bar and grill.  Streets were named Biglake Avenue, Lakespring Avenue and Longmeadow Avenue to draw attention away from the fact that the town was in fact a barren desert used for filming westerns. The lake was left to evaporate in the early 1980s after the initial developers sold their interests. Much of the land was sold to buyers who never visited the area. There are efforts to refill the lake, but the main obstacle has been funding.

The film history of the region dates back to 1938. Numerous movies, serials, commercials and television series were filmed in Lake Los Angeles for decades. Filmed segments and stock footage of "Bonanza" episodes made at the region include "The Mission", "Gallagher's Sons", "Twilight Town", "Big Shadow on the Land", "The Deed and the Dilemma", "The Oath", "Second Chance" and "Meena." Lake Los Angeles has two filming locations named "Four Aces Movie Location" (located on the northwest corner of 145th Street East and Avenue Q) and "Club Ed" (located east of 150th Street East between Avenue N and Avenue K). Both locations and surrounding areas have been used for television series, feature films, music videos, and television commercials.

Demographics

2010
At the 2010 census Lake Los Angeles had a population of 12,328. The racial makeup of Lake Los Angeles was 6,862 (55.7%) White (31.9% Non-Hispanic White), 1,388 (11.3%) African American, 178 (1.4%) Native American, 116 (0.9%) Asian, 27 (0.2%) Pacific Islander, 3,068 (24.9%) from other races, and 689 (5.6%) from two or more races. Hispanic or Latino of any race were 6,604 persons (53.6%).

The census reported that 12,299 people (99.8% of the population) lived in households, 29 (0.2%) lived in non-institutionalized group quarters, and no one was institutionalized.

There were 3,267 households, 1,709 (52.3%) had children under the age of 18 living in them, 1,793 (54.9%) were opposite-sex married couples living together, 548 (16.8%) had a female householder with no husband present, 324 (9.9%) had a male householder with no wife present.  There were 265 (8.1%) unmarried opposite-sex partnerships, and 20 (0.6%) same-sex married couples or partnerships. 445 households (13.6%) were one person and 138 (4.2%) had someone living alone who was 65 or older. The average household size was 3.76.  There were 2,665 families (81.6% of households); the average family size was 4.08.

The age distribution was 4,089 people (33.2%) under the age of 18, 1,390 people (11.3%) aged 18 to 24, 2,882 people (23.4%) aged 25 to 44, 3,030 people (24.6%) aged 45 to 64, and 937 people (7.6%) who were 65 or older.  The median age was 29.9 years. For every 100 females, there were 100.8 males.  For every 100 females age 18 and over, there were 98.8 males.

There were 3,658 housing units at an average density of 373.7 per square mile, of the occupied units 2,374 (72.7%) were owner-occupied and 893 (27.3%) were rented. The homeowner vacancy rate was 4.5%; the rental vacancy rate was 7.4%.  8,418 people (68.3% of the population) lived in owner-occupied housing units and 3,881 people (31.5%) lived in rental housing units.

According to the 2010 United States Census, Lake Los Angeles had a median household income of $45,440, with 27.1% of the population living below the federal poverty line.

2000
At the 2000 census there were 11,523 people, 3,137 households, and 2,613 families in the CDP. The population density was 885.7 inhabitants per square mile (342.0/km). The racial makeup of the CDP was 61.01% White, 12.11% African American, 1.49% Native American, 1.00% Asian, 0.16% Pacific Islander, 18.73% from other races, and 5.49% from two or more races. Hispanic or Latino of any race were 33.58%.

Of the 3,137 households 52.4% had children under the age of 18 living with them, 59.9% were married couples living together, 15.5% had a female householder with no husband present, and 16.7% were non-families. 11.7% of households were one person and 2.6% were one person aged 65 or older. The average household size was 3.66 and the average family size was 3.92.

The age distribution was 39.9% under the age of 18, 7.8% from 18 to 24, 27.9% from 25 to 44, 18.8% from 45 to 64, and 5.6% 65 or older. The median age was 28 years. For every 100 females, there were 99.3 males. For every 100 females age 18 and over, there were 94.7 males.

The median household income was $38,794 and the median family income  was $37,533. Males had a median income of $36,737 versus $24,917 for females. The per capita income for the CDP was $12,209. About 19.7% of families and 23.1% of the population were below the poverty line, including 31.5% of those under age 18 and 8.0% of those age 65 or over.

Government

Public services
The Los Angeles County Sheriff's Department (LASD) operates the Lancaster Station in Lancaster, serving Lake Los Angeles.

The Los Angeles County Department of Health Services operates the Antelope Valley Health Center in Lancaster, serving Lake Los Angeles.

See also

References

External links
Lake Los Angeles Rural Town Council (Unsafe redirect)
Lake Los Angeles Chamber of Commerce

Census-designated places in Los Angeles County, California
Populated places in the Mojave Desert
Geography of Palmdale, California
Populated places established in 1967
Census-designated places in California